Arbuthnot Road is a road in Central, Hong Kong. The road begins at the Former Central Magistracy, a declared monument of Hong Kong. The road ends at the Hong Kong Zoological and Botanical Gardens.

History
Most of the roads built and declared at the outset in Colonial Hong Kong in 1841 were close to the waterfront. The Magistracy was not established until 1847 and the land on which it was built was previously largely unoccupied. Arbuthnot Road is rather inclined, and runs between Hollywood Road and Caine Road, the latter of which was not named until 1859. It is likely that it was not named or created until the 1850s or later; it was named after George Arbuthnot.

Notable buildings
No. 1: Hong Kong Police Club, former Central Magistracy
No. 2: Cafe O, Ovolo Hotels
No.s 3-5a: Universal Trade Centre including the Orthodox Metropolitanate of Hong Kong and South-East Asia and the St Luke Cathedral of Hong Kong
No.s 4-8: Philia Lounge
No.s 4-8: G/F La Kasbah (North African Food), 1/F Wild Grass (Western Restaurant)
No.s 4-8: SK serviced apartments
No. 10: Chez Moi (French restaurant)

See also
List of streets and roads in Hong Kong

References

External links

Google Maps of Arbuthnot Road

Central, Hong Kong
Mid-Levels
Roads on Hong Kong Island